StudyTube, sometimes referred to as EduTube is an informal group of content creators on YouTube whose content focuses on studying, test and exam preparation, and school. These types of YouTubers are known as StudyTubers. The term can also refer to the genre of YouTube video characterized by its focus on the same topics.

Origins 

Some have claimed StudyTube began as early as 2015. YouTubers Derin Adetosoye and Ruby Granger cite 2018 as the year StudyTube came about. However, StudyTube channels, including Granger's, existed and created StudyTube content in 2017. The Times popularized the term StudyTuber in 2018. The genre was repopularized during the COVID-19 pandemic.

StudyTube has counterpart communities on other platforms including Studyblr (Tumblr), Studygram (Instagram), and Studytok (TikTok). Studyblr predates StudyTube and has been referred to as an origin point for StudyTube.

Format 
The most common video format on StudyTube is real-time, often hours long, "study with me" style videos and livestreams featuring someone studying on camera. StudyTubers often give advice for GSCEs and A-Levels. StudyTube videos can also include grade or results-reaction videos and Q&As about university life. It is also common for StudyTube videos to be vlogs of the content creator's university experience. StudyTube videos often focus on productivity, though some have criticized StudyTube for promoting a culture of so-called 'toxic productivit'y.

Notable channels 
Most prominent StudyTubers are British. Prominent British StudyTube channels include Jack Edwards, Eve Cornwell, UnJaded Jade, Ruby Granger, and Vee Kativhu.

See also 

 BookTube

References 

Education-related YouTube channels
Student mass media